Plan 9 is an American neo-psychedelic band from Rhode Island formed in 1979.

The group was named for the 1950s science fiction film Plan 9 from Outer Space.Hoekstra, Dave (June 9, 1989). "Dave's Dawn Patrol", Chicago Sun-Times, p. 7.

The Calgary Herald wrote, in 1989, "Its music has that spirited, no-holds-barred feel of rock from the '60s while managing to not sound dated."

The band was inducted into the Rhode Island Music Hall of Fame in 2017, alongside Throwing Muses and several other acts.

Members
 Eric Stumpo
 Debora D
 John DeVault
 Albertron
 Harry Keithline
 Mike Meehan (1979–1984)
 Tom Champlin
 Alex Nagle
 Evan Williams
 John Florence
 Frank Villani
 Brian Thomas (1985)
 Brent Hosier (1985–86)
 Evan Laboissionniere
 Steve Anderson
 Norman Wrigley

Discography

Singles
 I Can't Stand This Love, Goodbye 5 Years Ahead of My Time Brian T & Plan 9 EP Around the USA Merry ChristmasAlbums
 Frustration EP (Voxx, 1981)
 Dealing With the Dead (Midnight, 1983)
 Plan 9 (New Rose, 1984)
 It's a Live/I Just Killed a Man and I Don't Want to See Any Meat... (Midnight, 1985)
 Keep Your Cool and Read the Rules (Pink Dust/Enigma 1986)
 Anytime Anyplace Anywhere (Restless/Enigma, 1986)
 Sea Hunt (Enigma, 1987)
 Ham & Sam Jammin' (Restless, 1989)
 Stock Footage (WorryBird, 1994)
 Pleasure Farm (J-Bird, 1998)
 Cow Town (Criswell Predicts, 2001)
 The Gathering (Criswell Predicts, 2001)
 9 Men's Misery (Criswell Predicts, 2001)
 Sour Tongue Readings (Criswell Predicts, 2002)
 Things I Do (Criswell Predicts, 2008)

Compilation appearances
 "I Like Girls" from Le Vie En Rose (New Rose Records, 1985)
 "Man Bites Dog" and "Ship of Fools" from The Enigma Variations 2 (Enigma Records, 1987)
 "Try to Run" from Rock'n'Rose'' (New Rose Records, 1990)

References

External links
Official site
Plan 9 Discography

American psychedelic rock music groups
Musical groups established in 1979
Musical groups from Rhode Island
Neo-psychedelia groups